Alone Against Rome (also known as Vengeance of the Gladiators) is a 1962 peplum film directed  by Luciano Ricci and starring Lang Jeffries and Rossana Podestà.

Cast
 Lang Jeffries as   Brennus		
 Rossana Podestà as  Fabiola
 Philippe Leroy  as   Sylla 	
 Gabriele Tinti as   Goruk			
 Luciana Angiolillo as Saron's  Servant 
  Giorgio Nenadovic  as Centurion Caius	
 Goffredo Unger as  Old Christian
  Rinaldo Zamperla as Light Blond Prisoner

Release
Alone Against Rome was released in September 1962 in Italy. It was later released in the United States in December 1963 with a 100-minute running time.

Reception
In a contemporary review, the Monthly Film Bulletin described the film as a "lavishly staged" and "shot in pale, restrained colours, this Italian spectacle reduces dialogue to the minimum and concentrates on as varied a display of violent action as the most eager fan could wish for, ranging from ambushes in the forest to bloody underground revolutions and equally savage gladiatorial contests." The review noted that "one has to forget the vapid, dubbed dialogue, and lumbering acting (the one exception being Philippe Leroy's villainous, cold-eyed Silla)." The review also noted the second-unit director Riccardo Freda, noting that "The arena scenes, in particular, are directed with a fine sense of movement and camera style by Riccardo Freda, who has now joined that select band of second unit directors on whom this kind of film tends to rely."

References

Footnotes

Sources

External links

1962 adventure films
Peplum films
Films set in the Roman Empire
Films about gladiatorial combat
Films with screenplays by Ernesto Gastaldi
Yugoslav adventure films
Sword and sandal films
1960s Italian films